Māalaea Bay is a large bay in the southwestern coast of Maui, in the Hawaiian islands. Several small towns are located close to the bay, notably the town of Māalaea.

The famous surf break known as “Freight Trains” crosses Māʻalaea Bay on Maui’s southern shore. Large waves, or swells, are typically generated in the southern hemisphere during winter, when large storms brew in the southern Pacific Ocean. These are some of the largest—rideable and accessible—waves on the planet.

References 

Bays of Hawaii
Bodies of water of Maui